Maiestas xenthocephalus (formerly Recilia xenthocephalus) is a species of leafhopper from the  Cicadellidae family that is endemic to India. It was formerly placed within Recilia, but a 2009 revision moved it to Maiestas.

References

Endemic fauna of India
Hemiptera of Asia
Maiestas